This is a list of animated television series first aired in 1991.

Anime television series first aired in 1991

See also
 List of animated feature films of 1991
 List of Japanese animation television series of 1991

References

Television series
Animated series
1991
1991
1991-related lists